Gifted is a 2017 American drama film directed by Marc Webb and written by Tom Flynn. It stars Chris Evans, Mckenna Grace, Lindsay Duncan, Jenny Slate and Octavia Spencer. The plot follows an intellectually gifted seven-year-old who becomes the subject of a custody battle between her maternal uncle and maternal grandmother. The film was released on April 7, 2017, by Fox Searchlight Pictures, and grossed $43 million worldwide. At the 23rd Critics' Choice Awards, Mckenna Grace was nominated for Best Young Actor/Actress. The film received mixed-to-positive reviews from critics, who praised the performances of Evans and Grace, but noted its predictability.

Plot 
In St. Petersburg, Florida, seven-year-old Mary Adler lives with her uncle and de facto guardian, Frank. Her best friend is her 43-year-old neighbor, Roberta Taylor. On her first day of first grade, she shows remarkable mathematical talent, which impresses her teacher, Bonnie Stevenson.

There, despite her initial disdain for average children her own age and her boredom with their classwork, Mary begins to bond with them when she brings her one-eyed cat, Fred, for show-and-tell. Later, she defends a classmate from a bully on the school bus by hitting the bully in the face. After the incident, the principal encourages Frank to send Mary to a private school for gifted children, offering the opportunity of a scholarship. However, Frank turns it down. Based on his family's experiences with similar schools, he fears she will not have a chance at a "normal" childhood.

It emerges that Mary's mother, Diane, had been a promising mathematician, dedicated to the Navier–Stokes problem (one of the unsolved Millennium Prize Problems) before dying by suicide when Mary was six months old. She has lived with Frank, a former college professor turned boat repairman, ever since.

The principal contacts Frank's estranged mother and Mary's maternal grandmother, Evelyn, who seeks to gain custody of Mary and move her to Massachusetts. Evelyn believes she is a "one-in-a-billion" mathematical prodigy who should be specially tutored in preparation for a life devoted to mathematics, much as Diane was. However, Frank is adamant that his sister would want Mary to be in a normal public school and have the childhood she did not have.

In court, Frank argues that Evelyn's parenting deprived Diane of a normal life; Evelyn had sent away a boy Diane was in love with, which was when she first attempted suicide. Evelyn argues that Frank is in no position to be a guardian, working a low-paying job without health insurance. Worried the judge will rule against him and he will lose Mary completely, Frank accepts a compromise brokered by his lawyer that sees Mary placed in foster care and attend the private school where Evelyn wants to have her enrolled. The foster parents live 25 minutes from Frank's home, he will be entitled to scheduled visits, and Mary will be able to decide where she wants to live after her 12th birthday.

Mary is devastated at being placed in foster care, and her foster father says she refuses to see Frank. When Bonnie sees a picture of Fred up for adoption, she alerts Frank. He retrieves the cat from the pound and, learning that Fred was brought in due to allergy issues, realizes that Evelyn, who is allergic to cats, is overseeing Mary's education in the guest house of Mary's foster home.

Frank then reveals to Evelyn, who had been a mathematician herself, that Diane had solved the Navier–Stokes problem but stipulated that the solution was to be withheld until Evelyn's death. Knowing that it meant everything to her to see Diane solve the problem, he offers her the opportunity to publish Diane's work if she drops her objection to him having custody of Mary. Evelyn agrees.

The film ends with Mary back in the custody of Frank, returning to public school and socializing with children her age while taking college-level courses.

Cast

Production 
In December 2014, Tom Flynn's screenplay was one of the 70 to make that year's Black List.  In August 2015, it was announced Chris Evans had been cast in the film, with Marc Webb directing. In September 2015, Mckenna Grace, Octavia Spencer, Lindsay Duncan and Jenny Slate joined the cast, and in November 2015, Julie Ann Emery was also added.

Filming began in October 2015 in Savannah, Georgia, as well as in Tybee Island, Georgia, and finished in November 2015. Specific locations included May Howard Elementary School in Wilmington Island, Georgia and Emory University in Atlanta.

Although the film is set in St. Petersburg, Florida, screenwriter Tom Flynn was unable to convince the producers to film in Florida, because the state was no longer providing financial incentives to movie makers; that made Georgia a more financially viable option.

Mathematician Jordan Ellenberg, who was himself a child prodigy, was a mathematics consultant for the film; Webb contacted him after reading his article in The Wall Street Journal and asked him to share his experiences. Ellenberg also cameos as a professor lecturing on the partition function and Ramanujan's congruences.

Release 
The film was scheduled to be released on April 12, 2017, but was pushed up to April 7, 2017.

Box office 
Gifted grossed $24.8 million in the United States and Canada, and $18.2 million in other territories, for a worldwide total of $43 million against a production budget of $7 million.

The film went wide on Wednesday, April 12, 2017, and in its opening weekend grossed $3.1 million, finishing 6th at the box office. In its second weekend of wide expansion, it added more screens, and made $4.6 million, an increase of 47.5% from the previous week.

Critical response 
On review aggregation website Rotten Tomatoes, Gifted has an approval rating of 73% based on 173 reviews, with an average rating of 6.4/10. The site's critical consensus reads, "Gifted isn't quite as bright as its pint-sized protagonist, but a charming cast wrings respectably engaging drama out of a fairly predictable premise." On Metacritic, the film has a weighted average score of 60 out of 100, based on 33 critics, indicating "mixed or average reviews". Audiences polled by CinemaScore gave the film an average grade of "A" on an A+ to F scale.

Colin Covert of the Star Tribune gave the film 3/4 stars, saying, "Sure, it's a simple, straightforward film, but sometimes that's all you need as long as its heart is true." On Evans' performance, Owen Gleiberman of Variety said, "Chris Evans, abashed and rumpled, with a grease monkey’s can’t-be-bothered-to-shave beard, gives an engaged performance, exuding a homespun warmth we haven’t seen in the “Captain America” films." Richard Roeper gave the film 4 out of 4 stars and said, "Gifted isn't the best or most sophisticated or most original film of the year so far – but it just might be my favorite."

Accolades

See also 

 Proof, about a complex proof written by a mathematician or his daughter
 Little Man Tate, similar theme of prodigy and reluctance of the single parent to accept their need for better education
 List of films about mathematicians
 List of fictional child prodigies

References

External links 

 Official website
 
 
 

2010s American films
2010s English-language films
2010s legal drama films
2017 drama films
2017 films
American courtroom films
American legal drama films
Films about children
Films directed by Marc Webb
Films scored by Rob Simonsen
Films set in Florida
Films shot in Georgia (U.S. state)
Fox Searchlight Pictures films
Gifted education
Women in mathematics